Robert Johnston may refer to:

Rob Johnston, Assistant General Secretary of International Transport Workers Federation
Robert Johnston (1783–1839), plantation owner in Jamaica
Bert Johnston (footballer) (1909–1968), Scottish footballer (Sunderland AFC)
Bob Johnston (1932–2015), American record producer
Bob Johnston (economist) (born 1924), former governor of the Reserve Bank of Australia
Bob Johnston (footballer) (1929–2012), Australian footballer for Melbourne
Bobby Johnston (born 1967), composer and musician
Robbie Johnston (born 1967), long-distance runner
Robert Johnston (VC) (1872–1950), Irish rugby union player and soldier
Robert Johnston (American politician) (1818–1885), American politician of the Confederate States
Robert Johnston (Canadian politician) (1856–1913), farmer and political figure in Ontario, Canada
Robert Johnston (cricketer) (1849–1897), Scottish-born New Zealand cricketer who played for Otago
Robert Johnston (naval officer) (1792–1882), early Australian Navy officer
Robert B. Johnston (born 1937), retired United States Marine Corps lieutenant general
Robert Daniel Johnston (1837–1919), brigadier general for the Confederate States of America during the American Civil War
Robert Mackenzie Johnston (1843–1918), Scottish-Australian statistician
Robert Matteson Johnston (1867–1920), American historian
Robert Mercer Johnston (1916–1985), Ontario political figure
Robert Smith Johnston, Lord Kincraig (1918–2004), Scottish judge
Georgie Fab (Robert George Johnston, born 1952), Canadian rock musician, guitarist, singer songwriter and producer
Robert S. Johnston, president of Saint Louis University
Robert Johnston, former guitarist for Life Without Buildings

See also
Robert Johnson (disambiguation)
Robert Johnstone (disambiguation)
Bert Johnston (disambiguation)